Fourche a Renault is an extinct town in Washington County, in the U.S. state of Missouri.

A post office was established at Fourche a Renault in 1831, and remained in operation until 1905. The community took its name from the nearby creek of the same name.

References

Ghost towns in Missouri
Former populated places in Washington County, Missouri